Claudia Lauren Green (born 6 December 1997) is a New Zealand cricketer who plays for the Central Districts Hinds. On her debut in first-class cricket, Green took a wicket with her seventh delivery. Green is also studying physical education at the University of Otago, and was appointed as the Female Development Officer for Nelson Cricket.

In February 2021, during England's tour of New Zealand, Green took a five-wicket haul for the New Zealand XI Women side in a warm-up match. In August 2021, Green earned her maiden call-up to the New Zealand women's cricket team, for their tour of England. In July 2022, Green was added to New Zealand's team for the cricket tournament at the 2022 Commonwealth Games in Birmingham, England.

References

External links

1997 births
Living people
Cricketers from Nelson, New Zealand
New Zealand women cricketers
Central Districts Hinds cricketers
Cricketers at the 2022 Commonwealth Games
Commonwealth Games bronze medallists for New Zealand
Commonwealth Games medallists in cricket
Medallists at the 2022 Commonwealth Games